Andrea Doria (1466–1560) was an Italian (Genoese) admiral.

Andrea Doria may also refer to:

Ships
 Andrew Doria (1775 brig) or Andrea Doria, an American warship
 Italian ironclad Andrea Doria, a pre-dreadnought battleship completed in 1891
 Italian battleship Andrea Doria, a dreadnought battleship completed in 1916
 SS Andrea Doria, an ocean liner launched in 1951
 Italian cruiser Andrea Doria, a missile-launcher cruiser commissioned in 1964
 Italian destroyer Andrea Doria, an Orizzonte-class destroyer commissioned in 2007

Other uses
 "The Andrea Doria" (Seinfeld), a 1996 episode of Seinfeld
 Society Andrea Doria, a Genoese football club that merged into U.C. Sampdoria
 2175 Andrea Doria, a Florian asteroid

See also
 Giovanni Andrea Doria (1539–1606), Genoese admiral related to Andrea Doria
 Italian ship Andrea Doria, a list of warships
 Portrait of Andrea Doria (Sebastiano del Piombo), a 1526 painting
 Portrait of Andrea Doria as Neptune, a c. 1540 painting by Bronzino